Dick Wei (born April 15, 1953) is a Taiwanese actor, director and writer who specializes in martial arts and action films.

Early life and career

A Hakka, he was born in the town of Pingtung in southern Taiwan and began studying martial arts in Junior High School, winning numerous competitions. Later, he served in the Taiwanese army, attaining the rank of captain, and was an instructor in unarmed combat, especially Tae Kwon Do.

His first films were made while he was still in the army (mostly low budget Taiwanese productions). His earliest movie appearance may be a brief fight scene with Ti Lung in the Shaw Brother's Iron Chain Assassin from 1974.

Discovery

While operating a martial arts studio in Taipei, he was spotted by Chang Cheh, who persuaded him to have a screen test which was shown to Sir Run Run Shaw. He later signed with the Shaw Brothers and moved to Hong Kong in 1977. Here he made several films under the name "Tu Lung". These included The Five Venoms, Kid With a Tattoo and Kid with the Golden Arm.

From the Shaw Brothers he moved to Golden Harvest where he joined Sammo Hung's team of actor/stuntmen along with such notables as Yuen Wah and Lam Ching-ying. The characters he played many include "Lo San Pao" (the pirate king in Project A), Bandit number 6 in Millionaire's Express, and one of Frankie Chan's henchmen in The Prodigal Son. Sammo also used him to help train Joyce Godenzi (the future Mrs. Hung) for the movie Eastern Condors. He was also involved in Michelle Yeoh's training when she first began to make martial arts movies. Yuen Biao included him as a co-star in two of his projects - The Champions and Rosa.

Later roles and directing

He moved on to play a variety of honorable villains and driven cops in films with stars such as Cynthia Khan and Cynthia Rothrock (whose jaw he is reputed to have broken). Other notables he has worked with include Chow Yun-fat, Chow Sing Chi and Simon Yam. Later, he was the action director and co-star on one of Jet Li's earlier films, Dragon Fight.

More recently he has moved back home to Taiwan where he has turned his hand to directing and producing. He is working in Taiwanese television and has starred in a number of movies, including some made-for-television. It is rumored that he is currently (2009) involved in a Magnificent Seven type project along with such veteran film actors as Leung Kar Yan.

Selected filmography

 Long hu kong shou dao (1973)
 Nu han meng niu (1974)
 Fa qian han (1977)
 Brave Archer (1977) - Yang Tieh-hsin
 Chinatown Kid (1977) - Kung Fu Student
 Sheng si dou (1978)
 She diao ying xiong chuan xu ji (1978)
 Shaolin Handlock (1978) - Li Pai
 Five Venoms (1978) - Master
 The Avenging Eagle (1978) - Han Sung
 Yi tian tu long ji (1978)
 Invincible Shaolin (1978) - South Shaolin teacher #1
 Crippled Avengers (1979) - Tien Nan Tiger #1 of the Southern Sky
 Lun Wenxu zhi dou Liu Xiankai (1979)
 Jiao tou (1979)
 Kid with the Golden Arm (1979) - Sand Palm Fighter
 Qi sha (1979) - Yang security agent
 Di san lei da dou (1980) - Jin Cha
 Cha chi nan fei (1980)
 Killer Constable (1980) - Suen-Heng
 Tong tian xiao zi gong qiang ke (1980) - Captain Fang
 Qing xia zhui feng jian (1980)
 Lian cheng jue (1980)
 Guangdong shi hu xing yi wu xi (1980) - Wang Teng Ko
 Lightning Kung Fu (1980)
 Dai dai feng liu dai dai chun, Di san zhi shou (1981) - Cheng Pei
 Prodigal Son, The (1981) - Mr Suen
 I.Q. ben dan (1981)
 Carry On Pickpocket (1982) - One of Chou Meng-Sheng's henchmen #5
 Winners and Sinners (1983) - Tar's Top Henchman
 The Champions (1983) - King
 Project A (1983) - Lor Sam Pau
 Pom Pom (1984) - Scarman
 The Owl vs Bombo (1984) - Au Gung's Man
 My Lucky Stars (1985) - Gang Member
 Ching fung dik sau (1985) - Fight champion
 Twinkle, Twinkle Lucky Stars (1985) - Warehouse Thug #3
 Heart of Dragon (1985) - Kim's Man #1
 Yes Madam (1985) - Dick
 Ping an ye (1985) - Allan Lee
 Dong fang wu shen (1985)
 Millionaire's Express (1986) - Mountain Bandit
 Qi yuan (1986) - The Warrior
 Rosa (1986) - Thug in Suit
 Hao xiao zi di er ji (1986)
 The Seventh Curse (1986) - Huh Lung
 Yong chuang jiang wu (1986)
 Feng chen shi san yi (1986)
 Yi ben wu yan (1987) - Mak Chi-Chieh
 Eastern Condors (1987) - General's elite soldier
 Project A Part II (1987) - San Pau (uncredited)
 Moh go yat jeung (1987) - The Monster
 Return of the Kickfighter (1987) - Bad Brother
 Guo bu xin lang (1988) - Thug in white Suit
 Xiu xiu gui (1988) - Lama
 Dragons Forever (1988) - Thug Leader
 Long hu zhi duo xing (1988)
 Ging wan gam man yeh (1988)
 Lie ying ji hua (1988) - Lung
 Huang jia shi jie zhi III: Ci xiong da dao (1988) - Diamonds' Fence
 Sha chu Xiang Gang (1988) - Lok Han
 Tong gen sheng (1989) - Killer from Vietnam
 Pedicab Driver (1989) - Wei
 Ao qi xiong ying (1989) - Popeye
 Mu zhong wu ren (1989) - Bull
 Fei yue wei qiang (1989) - Chiu Ying-Kau
 Miracles (1989) - Tiger
 Dragon Fight (1989) - Wong Wai
 Zuan shi nu (1989)
 Huang jia fei feng (1989) - Ah-Wai
 Wu hui xing dong (1990)
 Xian fa zhi ren (1990)
 Wu ming jia zu (1990) - Wai
 Die xue jiang nu (1990)
 Lan du cai shen (1990) - Gang boss
 Zi dan chu zu (1990) - Dick
 Yellow Rain (1990)
 Du lang (1990)
 Da ge rang wei (1991)
 Lit foh ching sau (1991)
 Stone Age Warriors (1991) - First Guide
 Sha ru di yu (1991)
 Nu gui sheng si lian (1991)
 Mei dai mei xiao (1991)
 Guan ren gui shi (1991)
 Pu Jing da jie an (1992) - Tank
 Bun ngo lai yan (1992)
 Hong tian huang jia jiang (1992) - Sama
 Wu ye qing ren (1992)
 Xue ran hong chen (1992)
 Tou se yi hung mou (1992)
 Nu du shen (1992)
 Hei jie wu nan (1992)
 Hei dao nu ba wang (1992)
 Du ming xi yang (1992)
 Du ming shuang xiong (1992)
 Bu gan ji mo de nu ren (1992)
 Jing ji xing you xi (1993) - Big Brother Chung
 Qing she sha shou (1993)
 Feng qing wan zhong ye mei gui (1993)
 Supercop 2 (1993) - Ah Shuen
 Yuk fung (1993) - Yin
 Lian se liang (1993)
 Xin da xiao bu liang (1994) - Chang Tung-Pin
 Xiang jiao jing qi an (1994) - Kao Tien-Yun
 The Deadly Warrant (1994)
 Gun gun hong chun (1995) - Chen Wei
 Mr. X (1995) - Officer
 Bian cheng xiao xiong (1995)
 Yan pei go jang haai (1996) - Police Captain
 Han fu gang (1996)
 Sang yat doh luen si (1997) - Argentina
 Jietou han jiang (1997)
 X dang an Sha wu she (2001)
 Ji Fei Gou Tiao (2016) - Kung-Fu King

References

1953 births
People from Pingtung County
Taiwanese people of Hakka descent
Taiwanese-born Hong Kong artists
Taiwanese male taekwondo practitioners
Taiwanese male film actors
Living people